Ismael López may refer to:

Ismael López (footballer, born 1978), Spanish football attacking midfielder
Isma López (born 1990), Spanish football left-back

See also
Israel López (disambiguation)